St Thomas à Becket Catholic Secondary School is a coeducational secondary school with academy status in Wakefield, West Yorkshire, England. It has 749 pupils enrolled.

The current Headteacher is Dr Patrick Caldwell who succeeded from Catherine Baxendale beginning September 2022, who succeeded John J. Rooney, who succeeded Brian S. L. Donnellan at Christmas 2009.

Motto
The school's motto is "Esse Quam Videri", meaning "To be, rather than seem to be". This is also the title of the school hymn.

Specialist status
The school has a specialist status in humanities and used the money provided to improve technology in lessons.

References

Schools in Wakefield
Catholic secondary schools in the Diocese of Leeds
Secondary schools in the City of Wakefield
Academies in the City of Wakefield